Crockett is an unincorporated community in Wythe County, Virginia, United States. On September 18, 1992, Crockett postmistress Donna Jean Stevenson was murdered in the Crockett community post office.

Crockett's Cove Presbyterian Church

Crockett's Cove Road 
Crockett's Cove Road is an 8.4 mile that becomes a forest road and leads to Cove Mountain Road. It is also State Rt. 600 and Cove Road leads to it.

References

Unincorporated communities in Wythe County, Virginia
Unincorporated communities in Virginia